Bond's Chapel Methodist Episcopal Church, also known as Bond's Chapel, is a historic Methodist Episcopal church located near Hartsburg, Missouri. It was built in 1883–1884, and is a simple rectangular frame building, set on piers composed of creek rock and mortar. It measures 24 feet by 33 feet and has a front gable roof and vestibule.

It was added to the National Register of Historic Places in 1993.

See also
 List of cemeteries in Boone County, Missouri

References

External links
 

Methodist churches in Missouri
Churches on the National Register of Historic Places in Missouri
Churches completed in 1884
Churches in Boone County, Missouri
National Register of Historic Places in Boone County, Missouri
Methodist Episcopal churches in the United States